The New Klondike is a 1926 black-and-white silent romantic comedy sports drama film directed by Lewis Milestone for Famous Players-Lasky.  The film was set against the backdrop of the Florida land boom of the 1920s, and stands as Ben Hecht's first film assignment.

Background
Partly filmed on location in Miami, the film is based upon a short story by Ring Lardner and was inspired by both the national baseball craze and the Florida land boom speculation of 1925.  The film itself then inspired the 1926 Peggy Griffith novel The New Klondike – A Story of a Southern Baseball Training Camp.  The film proved successful enough to secure Thomas Meighan a long-term acting contract with Paramount.

Plot
Small-town pitcher Thomas Kelly (Thomas Meighan) is sent to Spring training with a minor league baseball team in Florida, but is fired by its jealous manager, Joe Cooley (Jack W. Johnston).  Kelly is then talked into being the celebrity endorser for a Florida real estate firm, and his former teammates invest money in the firm through him.  Still jealous of Kelly's popularity, Cooley conspires with crooked broker Morgan West (Robert Craig) to sell Kelly and the investors some worthless swampland.  Kelly and his friends lose their money, but Kelly struggles to recoup the losses.  He eventually makes a fortune, repays the investors, and is himself appointed team manager in place of Cooley.

Cast
 Thomas Meighan as Tom Kelly 
 Lila Lee as Evelyn Lane 
 Paul Kelly as Bing Allen 
 Tefft Johnson as Col. Dwyer 
 Hallie Manning as Flamingo Applegate 
 Robert W. Craig as Morgan West
 George De Carlton as Owen 
 Jack W. Johnston as Joe Cooley 
 Brenda Lane as Bird Dog 
 Danny Hayes as The Spieler

Reception
The New York Times wrote, "The wild scramble for Florida real estate is served up in a fairly humorous light in Thomas Meighan's latest production, 'The New Klondike,' which is Thomas J. Geraghty's adaptation of a special story by Ring Lardner."  They noted that the film was predictable and not overburdened with suspense, but that the film did provide "several amusing incidents concerned with the activities of the realtors and their victims."

Preservation status
Prints of this film are held in the Library of Congress film archive. It is in 35mm however one reel is missing.

References

External links
 The New Klondike at IMDB
 The New Klondike at SilentEra
 The New Klondike at AllMovie

1926 films
1920s crime comedy-drama films
1920s sports comedy-drama films
American sports comedy-drama films
American baseball films
American silent feature films
American black-and-white films
Films directed by Lewis Milestone
Paramount Pictures films
Famous Players-Lasky films
Films set in Florida
American crime comedy-drama films
1920s English-language films
1920s American films
Silent American comedy-drama films